The Sait Faik Short Story Award is a prize given annually by the Sait Faik Museum to the best collection of short stories in Turkish. The award has been given annually since 1955 and was started by the mother of Sait Faik Abasıyanık.

Selected winners of the Sait Faik Short Story Prize

Footnotes

References
 
 
 

Turkish literary awards
Turkish-language literature
Short story awards